Gerald of Braga, born in Cahors, Gascony, was a Benedictine monk at Moissac, France.

The Vita Sancti Geraldi was written by one Bernard, a companion and fellow Cluniac monk from France.

He later worked with the archbishop of Toledo, in Castile, and served as cathedral choir director. He baptised Afonso I of Portugal. He later became the reforming Bishop of Braga, Portugal on July 3, 1095, and stopped ecclesiastical investiture by laymen in his diocese. He died on December 5, 1109, and was buried in Braga Cathedral.

References

12th-century Christian saints
12th-century Roman Catholic bishops in Portugal
1109 deaths
Burials at Braga Cathedral
Portuguese Roman Catholic saints
Benedictine saints
Benedictine bishops
Portuguese Benedictines
Year of birth unknown
Bishops of Braga
People from Cahors